A combat medic, or healthcare specialist, is responsible for providing emergency medical treatment at a point of wounding in a combat or training environment, as well as primary care and health protection and evacuation from a point of injury or illness. Additionally, medics may also be responsible for the creation, oversight, and execution of long-term patient care plans in consultation with or in the absence of a readily-available physician or advanced practice provider. Combat medics may be used in hospitals and clinics, where they have the opportunity to work in additional roles such as operating medical and laboratory equipment and performing and assisting with procedures.

Canada

Training
All Regular Force Medical Technicians begin training with the Canadian Forces Leadership and Recruit School in Saint-Jean-sur-Richelieu, Quebec. Then they begin Occupational training at The Canadian Forces Health Services Training Center in Borden, Ontario, where they are taught how to maintain medical supplies and equipment,
screen patients, implement patient care plans, treat medical conditions, administer diagnostic procedures, medications, and continuous infusions. They also learn how to 
manage airways and assist with minor surgical procedures setting up deployed medical facilities and treating casualties in an operational and CBRNE environment over the course of 47-48 weeks. They also earn the Primary Care Paramedic Level 1 certification.
Advanced training can include, Preventive Medicine, Biomedical electronics, and Aviation Physiology, among others.

Assignments
Medical Technicians may be posted to any Canadian ship, or base as part of the base emergency response or as part of a clinic or hospital. They can also be deployed as the medical detachment of an infantry platoon, as part of a MEDEVAC helicopter team, or on a naval vessel. It is customary for soldiers to refer to their platoon medic as "Doc", similar to the US tradition.

USA

Training and certifications 
All military medical training in the United States takes place at Joint Base San Antonio, Fort Sam Houston, Texas. Here, among other medical jobs, Army Combat Medics, Air Force Medical Technicians, and Navy Hospital Corpsman complete their respective medical training programs. While there are similarities in the training and skills, each branch also incorporates training specific to their services needs and mission.

Although Combat Medics are certified at the EMT-B (Emergency Medical Technician, Basic) level upon graduation, their scope of practice often parallels and sometimes surpasses that of a paramedic. Their scope is expanded upon by the medical provider(s) assigned to the unit, who oversees the protocols and training of assigned medical personnel. Army medics follow a career progression sequence, wherein each rank above Specialist/Corporal (E4) comes with additional required knowledge, skills, and competencies.

Medics remain very versatile and may even diagnose illnesses and perform procedures usually performed by Advanced Practice Providers (Physician Assistants/Nurse Practitioners), and Physicians. Combat Paramedic Course, Prolonged Field Care Course, Flight Medic/Critical Care Course, and advanced Tactical Combat Casualty Care (TCCC) such as cadaver labs are some of the educational opportunities available to medics as they progress, which include the use of goats as training aids due to their similarity to human physiology.

Although most of the training translates into civilian certifications/licenses, medics often train and practice on skills and with medications outside of their civilian counterparts' scope of practice. Many programs are dedicated to and who provide preference for military medics transitioning into Paramedic, Registered Nurse (RN), and Physician Assistant (PA) educations.

Assignments

Hospitals and clinics 
Medics may also be assigned to combat support hospital units, forward surgical teams, and military treatment facilities and clinics where they can fulfill almost any role, from administrative duties to laboratory and medical equipment operations.

Field units 
When assigned to non-medical field units such as infantry, armored cavalry, artillery, combat engineers and military police, the personnel of the medical platoon are organic to the Headquarters and Headquarters Company/Detachment. The platoon is usually composed of three sections: Ambulance/Evac Section, Combat Medic/Line Medic Section, and the BAS/Treatment section. Each section is led by team leader, and the scope of practice all falls under the medical providers.

Ambulance/Evac medics function just like a civilian ambulance would. They are responsible for responding to and transporting patients from a point of injury to, as well as between medical care facilities.

The Battalion Aid Station (BAS)/Treatment Medics function similar to an urgent care/ small emergency department depending on size and resources. Under the direction of the medical provider and team leaders or sergeants, they intake, triage, and stabilize or treat patients for transfer to another tier or discharge. Battalion Aid Stations are more mobile than Combat Support Hospitals, but have less resources available. They are intended to move as the unit advances, whereas a Combat Support Hospital would have a more long-term fixed position.

Line medics are the most independent of the 3. Although they belong to Headquarters, they are attached to other platoons within a company and oversee the medical care of the soldiers assigned to them which can be anywhere from 30 to 60 Soldiers. They become a part of the group they are assigned to an with the exception of a few tasks, they do everything that their assigned soldiers do from training to missions. They are the ones who would be the first to treat an injured person and direct their immediate medical care, and are often the first to recognize when something is wrong with one of their soldiers because they spend so much time with them. They may also be the subject matter expert in advising leaders of medical planning for missions. Their co-location with the troops they are assigned allows them to easily monitor ongoing health.

Being a line medic requires them to carry whatever a regular soldier carries, in addition to an aid bag and other medical supplies. These medics must be very physically fit, and able to function well in highly stressful tactical situations. They are expected to be very independent and function on their own as extensions of the provider. They make field diagnosis and manage the conditions appropriately, deferring to the provider when necessary.

In the U.S. armed forces, service members in line units often refer to their assigned combat medic or hospital corpsman as "Doc."

Geneva Convention protection
In 1864, sixteen European states adopted the first-ever Geneva Convention to save lives and alleviate the suffering of wounded and sick persons in the battlefield, as well as to protect trained medical personnel as non-combatants, in the act of rendering aid.

Chapter IV, Article 25 of the Geneva Convention states that: "Members of the armed forces specially trained for employment, should the need arise, as hospital orderlies, nurses or auxiliary stretcher-bearers, in the search for or the collection, transport or treatment of the wounded and sick shall likewise be respected and protected if they are carrying out these duties at the time when they come into contact with the enemy or fall into his hands."
Article 29 reads: "Members of the personnel designated in Article 25 who have fallen into the hands of the enemy, shall be prisoners of war, but shall be employed on their medical duties insofar as the need arises."

According to the Geneva Convention, knowingly firing at a medic wearing clear insignia is a war crime.

In modern times, most combat medics carry a personal weapon, to be used to protect themselves and the wounded or sick in their care. By convention this is limited to small arms (including rifles). During World War II, for example, Allied medics serving the European and Mediterranean areas usually carried the M1911A1 pistol while those serving the Pacific theater carried pistols or M1 carbines. The German medics (Sanitätssoldaten) in medical units were issued with standard Kar98K, while the infantry level stretcher-bearers (Krankenträgeren) and medical NCOs (Sanitätsunteroffiziere) were issued Luger or Walther pistols. When and if they use their arms offensively, they then sacrifice their protection under the Geneva Conventions. In today's combat environment, many times non-conventional forces do not follow the Geneva Conventions, and actually deliberately target medical personnel identified by their equipment or insignia. Consequently, based on the tactical environment medics in some armies carry an M4 in addition to their pistol.

History 

The Roman Army used combat medics which were referred to as Capsarii after the box (capsa) of bandages which they carried. Forts could also have hospitals integrated into their designs.  
 
Surgeon Dominique Jean Larrey directed the Grande Armée of Napoleon to develop mobile field hospitals, or ambulances volantes ('flying ambulances'), in addition to a corps of trained and equipped soldiers (infirmiers tenues de service) to aid those on the battlefield. Before Larrey's initiative in the 1790s, wounded soldiers were either left amid the fighting until the combat ended or their comrades would carry them to the rear line.

During the American Civil War, musicians had the double duty of acting as stretcher-bearers to move the wounded to field hospitals and assisting surgeons operating on patients.  However, the results of using musicians as medical assistants were uneven, and while some became adept in the role others were more hindrance than help.  Surgeon (Major) Jonathan Letterman, Medical Director of the Army of the Potomac, realized a need for an integrated medical treatment and evacuation system, equipped with dedicated vehicles, organizations, facilities, and personnel. The Letterman plan for a dedicated ambulance corps was first implemented in September 1862 at the Battle of Antietam, Maryland, where it proved its worth.  Soon the U.S. Ambulance Corps became an integral part of the Union Army.  The Confederate States Army also implemented an ambulance corps, but it was plagued with shortages of men and materiel, making its job more difficult.

The United States Army's need for medical and scientific specialty officers to support combat operations resulted in the creation of two temporary components: the U.S. Army Ambulance Service, established on June 23, 1917, and the Sanitary Corps, established on June 30, 1917. Officers of the Sanitary Corps served in medical logistics, hospital administration, patient administration, resource management, x-ray, laboratory engineering, physical reconstruction, gas defense, and venereal disease control. They were dedicated members of the medical team that enabled American generals to concentrate on enemy threats rather than epidemic threats. On August 4, 1947, Congress created the Navy Medical Service Corps.

In the United States, a report entitled "Accidental Death and Disability: The Neglected Disease of Modern Society (1966)", was published by National Academy of Sciences and the National Research Council. Better known as "The White Paper" to emergency providers, it revealed that soldiers who were seriously wounded on the battlefields of Vietnam had a better survival rate than those individuals who were seriously injured in motor vehicle accidents on California freeways. Early research attributed these differences in outcome to a number of factors, including comprehensive trauma care, rapid transport to designated trauma facilities, and a new type of medical corpsman, one who was trained to perform certain critical advanced medical procedures such as fluid replacement and airway management, which allowed the victim to survive the journey to definitive care.

Red Cross, Red Crescent, and Red Star of David 

The International Committee of the Red Cross, a private humanitarian institution based in Switzerland, provided the first official symbol for medical personnel. The first Geneva convention, originally called for "Amelioration of the Condition of the Wounded and Sick in Armed Forces in the Field", officially adopted the red cross on a field of white as the identifying emblem. This symbol was meant to signify to enemy combatants that the medic qualifies as a non-combatant, at least while providing medical care. Islamic countries use a Red Crescent instead. During the 1876–1878 war between Russia and Turkey, the Ottoman Empire declared that it would use a red crescent instead of a red cross as its emblem, although it agreed to respect the red cross used by the other side. Although these symbols were officially sponsored by the International Federation of Red Cross and Red Crescent Societies, the Magen David Adom (Red Star of David, MDA), Israel's emergency relief service, used the Magen David (a red star of David on a white background). Israeli medics still wear the Magen David. To enable the MDA to become a fully recognized and participating member of the International Red Cross and Red Crescent Movement, Protocol III was adopted. It is an amendment to the Geneva Conventions relating to the Adoption of an Additional Distinctive Emblem and authorizes the use of a new emblem, known as the third protocol emblem or the Red Crystal. For indicative use on foreign territory, any national society can incorporate its unique symbol into the Red Crystal. Under Protocol III, the MDA will continue to employ the red Magen David for domestic use, and will employ the Red Crystal on international relief missions.

Modern day 

Medical personnel from most western nations carry weapons for protection of themselves and their patients but remain designated non-combatants, wearing the red cross, crescent or crystal. In the United States Armed Forces, MEDEVAC Vehicles will display a large Red Cross on a white background; however, ground forces do not display this due to increased targeting of medical personnel by insurgents in Iraq and Afghanistan.

Traditionally, most United States medical personnel also wore a distinguishing red cross, to denote their protection as non-combatants under the Geneva Convention. This practice continued into World War II. However, the enemies faced by professional armies in more recent conflicts are often insurgents who either do not recognize the Geneva Convention or choose not to adhere to it, and thus readily engage all personnel, irrespective of non-combatant status.   As their non-combatant status is not respected, many US medics no longer wear non-combatant markings. This can enable medics to be used as medically trained soldiers, fighting aggressively rather than just in self-defence. Combat Medics in the United States Army and United States Navy Hospital Corpsmen are virtually indistinguishable from regular combat troops, except for the extra medical equipment they carry.

The modern-day interpretation of the U.S. Army doctrine requires medics to carry one primary weapon and, if possible, a secondary weapon. It is also common to find American combat medics who are no longer wearing the red or white cross because it is considered unethical to do so when the combat medic is carrying a weapon and could engage in actual combat.

In the U.S. Navy, enlisted medical personnel are known as corpsmen, not medics. The colloquial form of address for a Hospital Corpsman and Army Medics is "Doc". In the Army and U.S. Marine Corps, this term is generally used as a sign of respect. The U.S. Navy deploys FMF Hospital Corpsman attached to U.S. Marine Corps units as part of the Fleet Marine Force. Since the U.S. Marine Corps is part of the Department of the Navy, it relies on Navy corpsmen and other Naval medical personnel for medical care.

U.S. Air Force aerospace medical services technicians have frequently served attached to U.S. Army units in recent conflicts. Though all combat medical personnel are universally referred to as "medic", within different branches of the U.S. military, the skill level, quality of training and scope of work performed by medics varies from branch to branch and unit to unit.

As a result of the 2005 BRAC, the U.S. Department of Defense has moved most medical training for all branches of the armed forces to Fort Sam Houston of Joint Base San Antonio. A new Medical Education and Training Campus was constructed and the Air Force's 937th Training Group and Naval Hospital Corps School were relocated to Fort Sam Houston, joining the Army's existing Army Medical Department Center & School.  Although each service has some training particular to its branch, the bulk of the course material and instruction is shared between medical personnel of the different services.

See also

68W – Healthcare Specialist (Combat Medic, U.S. Army) (Field Medic, U.S. Army).
Ambulance – Military use
Battlefield medicine
Brain Trauma Foundation
Combat Medical Technician – British Army Equivalent
Combat support hospital
Flight medic
Medical assistant
Medical evacuation
Military medicine
Polytrauma
Royal Army Medical Corps
Stretcher bearer
United States Air Force Pararescue
United States Navy Hospital Corpsman (U.S. Navy and Marine Corps)
United States Navy Amphibious Reconnaissance Corpsman (U.S. Navy)

References

Citations

Sources 

 STP 8-91W15-SM-TG SOLDIER'S MANUAL AND TRAINER'S GUIDE, MOS 91W, HEALTH CARE SPECIALIST, SKILL LEVELS 1/2/3/4/5

Further reading
 Cowdrey,  Albert E. United States Army in the Korean War: The Medics War (1987), full-scale scholarly official history; online free, covers 1950-53

External links

 Official U.S. Army Home of the 68W - Health Care Specialist
 Corpsman.com – a website run by Docs for Docs of all US military services
 90th Infantry Division / 315th Medical Battalion webpage (90th Infantry Division Preservation Group website) – has links to other pages showing equipment of US, German and Japanese medics
 WW2 US Medical Research Centre - provides vast amounts of data relating to WW2 US Army Medics
 National Registry of Emergency Medical Technicians
 National Association of Emergency Medical Technicians
 NHTSA Emergency Medical Services official website (U.S. National Highway Traffic Safety Administration)
 

 
Medic